Trygve Haugeland (18 March 1914 –  10 December 1998) was a Norwegian politician for the Centre Party.

Biography 
He was born in Lyngdal.

He was elected to the Norwegian Parliament from Vest-Agder in 1958, but was not re-elected in 1961. He had previously served in the position of deputy representative during the terms 1945–1949 and 1950–1953.

He was the Minister of the Environment in 1972–1973 during the cabinet Korvald. He left the post seven months before the tenure of the cabinet ended.

On the local level he was member of Lyngdal municipality council from 1945 to 1955, serving as deputy mayor from 1947.

References

1914 births
1998 deaths
People from Vest-Agder
People from Lyngdal
Ministers of Climate and the Environment of Norway
Centre Party (Norway) politicians
Members of the Storting
20th-century Norwegian politicians